Brachyolene is a genus of longhorn beetles of the subfamily Lamiinae.

Species 
Containing the following species:

 Brachyolene albosignata Breuning, 1958
 Brachyolene albostictica Breuning, 1948
 Brachyolene brunnea Aurivillius, 1914
 Brachyolene capensis Breuning, 1970
 Brachyolene flavolineata Breuning, 1951
 Brachyolene nigrescens Breuning, 1977
 Brachyolene ochreosignata Breuning, 1940
 Brachyolene picta (Breuning, 1938)
 Brachyolene pictula Breuning, 1940
 Brachyolene seriemaculata Breuning, 1942
 Brachyolene unicolor Breuning, 1974

References

Tetraulaxini